The Taiping Bridge, commonly known as Widow Bridge, is a historic stone arch bridge over the  in the town of Huicheng, She County, Anhui, China.

History
Taiping Bridge was first built as a floating bridge in 1234 during the reign of Emperor Lizong of the Southern Song dynasty (1127–1279) and known as "Qingfeng Bridge". A wooden bridge was built in the early Ming dynasty (1368–1644) and was changed into a stone bridge in the Hongzhi period (1488–1506). It was rebuilt in the 56th year  (1717) of the Kangxi ear of the Qing dynasty (1644–1911) and strengthened and maintained in 1996.

On 16 October 2019, it was listed among the eighth batch of "Major National Historical and Cultural Sites in Anhui" by the State Council of China.

Gallery

References

Bridges in Anhui
Arch bridges in China
Bridges completed in 1717
Qing dynasty architecture
Buildings and structures completed in 1717
1717 establishments in China
Major National Historical and Cultural Sites in Anhui